Dolabrosaurus is a genus of extinct reptile and a member of the family Drepanosauridae. Fossils of Dolabrosaurus have been found in the Chinle Formation of New Mexico.

References 

Drepanosaurs
Late Triassic reptiles of North America
Norian life
Fossils of the United States
Fossil taxa described in 1992
Prehistoric reptile genera